Nebria simulator is a species of ground beetle in the Nebriinae subfamily that is endemic to North Korea.

References

simulator
Beetles described in 1933
Beetles of Asia
Endemic fauna of North Korea